The Maya ruins of Belize include a number of well-known and historically important pre-Columbian Maya archaeological sites. Belize is considered part of the southern Maya lowlands of the Mesoamerican culture area, and the sites found there were occupied from the Preclassic (2000 BCE–200 CE) until and after the arrival of the Spanish in the 16th century.

Many sites are in danger due to destruction by construction companies, which frequently source road fill from the ancient ruins.

Caracol
Historically the most important site, Caracol ('the snail' in Spanish), is located in western Belize, near the border with Guatemala and within the Chiquibul Forest Reserve. Caracol was the center of one of the largest Maya kingdoms and today contains the extant remains of thousands of structures.  The city was an important player in the Classic period political struggles of the southern Maya lowlands, and is known for defeating and subjugating Tikal (while allied with Calakmul, located in Campeche, Mexico).

Cerros
The site of Cerros, located on Corozal Bay in northern Belize, is notable as one of the earliest Maya sites, reaching its apogee during the Late Preclassic on Corozal Bay, and for the presence of an E-Group, a unique structural complex found in Maya architecture.

Lamanai
Lamanai, located on the New River in Orange Walk District, is known for being the longest continually-occupied site in Mesoamerica.  The initial settlement of Lamanai occurred during the Early Preclassic, and it was continuously occupied up to and through the colonization of the area.  During the Spanish conquest of Yucatán, the conquistadores established a Roman Catholic church at Lamanai, but a revolt by the native Maya drove them away.  The extant remains of the church are still standing today.  

There are 3 Mayan temples in the Lamanai archaeological reserve: Mask Temple, High Temple and Temple of the Jaguar, along with ball courts.  From a town of Tower Hill to the north, you take a boat along the New River to get to the site.  Howler monkeys and boa constrictors have also been seen on the hiking trail to the temples.

Other sites
The following is a list of other archaeological sites located within Belize:

 Actun Tunichil Muknal
 Altun Ha
 Baking Pot
 Barton Creek Cave
 Cahal Pech
 Caracol
 Cerros
 Chaa Creek
 Colha
 Cuello
 El Pilar
 Ka'Kabish
 K'axob
 La Milpa
 Lamanai
 Louisville
 Lubaantun
 Marco Gonzalez
 Minanha
 Nim Li Punit
 Nohmul
 Nohoch Che'en
 Pacbitun
 Pusilha
 San Estevan
 Santa Rita, Corozal
 Tipu
 Uxbenka
 Xnaheb
 Xunantunich

References

External links 

 Belize Archaeological Sites and Parks

 
Former populated places in Belize
Tourist attractions in Belize